The TransLatina Coalition, stylized as the TransLatin@ Coalition, is a national, Los Angeles-based 501(c)(3) nonprofit public charity advocacy group that works on behalf of transgender Latina women who are immigrants to the United States. It established and runs the Center for Violence Prevention and Transgender Wellness and works with policymakers and organizations to advance advocacy and resource support for transgender Latinas. Its staff consists of leaders from across the United States who have specific experience in meeting the needs of transgender Latinas intersecting with public health, education, and social justice, with representation in over 11 U.S. states, Washington D.C., and Mexico City, with over seven organized chapters.

History
The TransLatina Coalition began as a radical grassroots organization, founded by Bamby Salcedo and formed in collaboration with other trans activists and leaders in 2009. Salcedo had been on the organizing committee for a statewide conference, and had request from the leadership a room in which to assemble other trans activists. (Loose Accents podcast; Season 2, Episode 4; 28:30) This launched conversations which inspired Salcedo to once again organize fellow trans women when she was invited to be a keynote speaker at a national conference. (Loose Accents podcast; Season 2, Episode 4; 29:10) The meetings were foundational for the organization, as the conversations affirmed that basic needs among trans women were not being met, from food and shelter to clothing, employment opportunities, and ability to travel. Hence the organization transitioned from solely radical grassroots action into direct service provision for the trans Latina community.(Loose Accents podcast; Season 2, Episode 4; 30:12, 30:43)

Also in 2009, Salcedo began collaborating with University of Minnesota doctoral candidate, Karla M. Padrón, on her dissertation which centered trans experience in the investigation of topics including labor, migration, and gender narratives, and was which was published in 2015. This would be just one of the TransLatina Coalition's creation of studies and reports throughout their history, and would set the stage for their social justice work and political activism, including the report TransVisible: Transgender Latina Immigrants in U.S. Society.. It also set the groundwork for the 2013 documentary about Salcedo's life, Transvisible: The Bamby Salcedo Story.

In the early 2010s, word surfaced that the organization aimed to create a "one-stop" trans wellness center, seeking backing from the L.A. County Board of Supervisors. In January 2016, the organization received its first grant, which supported reentry services for trans women released from immigration detention. Also in 2016, the coalition released a report on trans health, “The State of Trans Health: Trans Latin@s and their Healthcare Needs.” The same year, the Elton John AIDS Foundation sponsored the coalition's Surviving People Unveiling Knowledge (SPUNK) program with a $125,000 grant. The grant helped further the SPUNK program's mission to support transgender women recently released from incarceration and immigration detention centers by way of individualized peer-led navigation through legal, housing, and healthcare systems. It also helped SPUNK to offer trans women financial assistance, from housing, food vouchers, and public transit passes to life skills workshops, political advocacy and public speaking courses, sex education, and HIV/AIDS prevention education workshops. The Arcus Foundation also gave the TransLatina Coalition a grant in 2016 to support the organization in its mission of fostering transgender justice. In 2017, Bamby Salcedo, President and CEO of the TransLatina Coalition, was selected as a recipient of an Arcus Leadership Fellowship. Salcedo was one of 12 executive directors chosen for the 18-month-long professional development position.

On Feb. 1, 2017, the organization was able to open the Center for Violence Prevention and Transgender Wellness. The center's opening was funded through a $1 million annual grant from the L.A. County Department of Public Health, with funds allocated to span between three and five years. It was also made possible through further funding from the Elton John AIDS Foundation and partnerships with APAIT (Asian Pacific AIDS Intervention Team), Bienestar, the Los Angeles Children's Hospital, Friends Community Center, and the Los Angeles LGBT Center. The same year, the City of Los Angeles Workforce Investment Board sponsored the coalition's trans workforce assessment as well as their workforce development innovation program. The city body had previously allotted, through their AB 1111: Breaking Barriers to Employment Initiative Grant Program, a grant of $249,745.50 toward the TransLatina Coalition and the Los Angeles LGBT Center to boost employment services created for trans people in need. In June 2017, the TransLatina Coalition once again became a grant recipient of the Arcus Foundation, whose selections would give special focus to "creating a response to conservative religious voices and anti-LGBT discrimination, with a particular focus on the continent of Africa."

Additionally, the State of California Office of Emergency Services sponsored the TransLatina Coalition's Trans POWER initiative. Another initiative that received sponsorship was the coalition's Be DOWN leadership development program in Washington, D.C., this time made possible through AIDS United's Fund for Resilience, Equity, and Engagement (FREE).

In 2019, Gilead Sciences selected the TransLatina Coalition as one of 15 transgender advocacy organizations among which it would distribute its TRANScend™ Community Impact Fund, a $4.5 million donation. The funds, a direct service grant, was a $100,000 grant to benefit the TransLatina Coalition's Helping Our People Evolve (HOPE) Housing Program, a transitional housing program which intersects with the objective of HIV prevention. In November 2019, the coalition was honored as a Gender Justice Champion at Celebrating Our Power, a gala hosted by The Women's Foundation of California, at which Los Angeles Mayor Eric Garcetti deliver one of two keynote addresses.

As of 2020, the coalition's services include but are not limited to leadership development, ESL classes, daily food distribution, and support to trans immigrants who have been detained by immigration enforcement.

State representation and chapters
The coalition is represented in over 11 U.S. states, Washington D.C., and Mexico City and includes over seven organized chapters. Cities, states, and municipalities in participation include Fort Lauderdale, Florida; Houston, Texas; Atlanta, Georgia; Tucson, Arizona; Chicago, Illinois; New York, New York; and North Carolina.

Events
The organization hosts the annual GARRAS Fashion Show, a fundraiser, which highlights the contributions that trans and trans allies make to the fashion, business, and leadership communities. In 2016, the show generated $10,000 which enable the coalition to launch their daily meal distribution program. In 2017, the show raised $60,000, which enabled the organization to hire their director of programs and expand their food distribution program. In 2018 alone, the show generated $120,000, enabling the coalition to launch their transitional housing program.

Activism
The organization's services are considered activism in action, though the organization partakes in targeted instances of activism, such as unfurling a 15'x20', 300-square-foot trans rights banner at the 2018 World Series, which received national coverage from major news outlets; facilitating a week-long protest and year-long campaign, along with the National Immigrant Justice Center, to pressure ICE to free a trans Salvadoran asylum-seeker named Alejandra Barrera from Cibola Detention Facility, where she had been unduly held for almost two years; participating in the Transgender Law Center's #FreeNicoll, a campaign to release Guatemalan asylum-seeker Nicoll Hernández-Polanco from undue detention in an all-male facility; representing the trans community at the Women's March in Washington, D.C; lobbying the media for accurate coverage of transgender stories; protesting against violence exacted upon trans people; disrupting trans-exclusionary CNN and Human Rights Campaign Town Hall meetings, staging die-ins, and more. In 2019, the coalition engaged in direct activism in partnership with the Transgender Resource Center of New Mexico "to help connect individuals to legal advice and social services while in detention, and coordinate post-release assistance, including housing, hot meals, transportation, and clothing."

Awards and honors
Repeat grantee of the Elton John AIDS Foundation
Repeat grantee of the Arcus Foundation
Grantee of Borealis Philanthropy
Grantee of Gilead Sciences
Grantee of the Los Angeles County Department of Public Health
Grantee of the City of Los Angeles Workforce Investment Board

References

501(c)(3) organizations
LGBT political advocacy groups in the United States
Legal advocacy organizations in the United States
Transgender organizations in the United States
Organizations for LGBT people of color
Immigrant rights organizations in the United States
Civil rights organizations in the United States
Non-profit organizations based in Los Angeles
Non-profit organizations based in California
Organizations established in 2009
2009 establishments in California